Atogepant, sold under the brand name Qulipta, is a medication used to prevent migraines. It is a gepant, an orally active calcitonin gene-related peptide receptor (CGRPR) antagonist.

It was approved for medical use in the United States in September 2021.

Medical uses 
Atogepant is indicated for the preventive treatment of episodic migraine in adults.

Research 
A study found that atogepant reduced the number of migraine days over twelve weeks.

References

External links 
 

AbbVie brands
Antimigraine drugs
Calcitonin gene-related peptide receptor antagonists
Carboxamides
Organofluorides
Piperidines
Pyridines
Pyrroles
Spiro compounds